Silver Lake Township is one of sixteen townships in Adams County, Nebraska, United States. The population was 63 at the 2020 census.

See also
County government in Nebraska

References

External links
City-Data.com

Townships in Adams County, Nebraska
Hastings Micropolitan Statistical Area
Townships in Nebraska